Two ships of the Royal Fleet Auxiliary have borne the name RFA Derwentdale:

  was a  oiler and landing ship, gantry launched in 1941 and sold in 1960.
  was a  mobile reserve tanker launched in 1964 as Halcyon Breeze. She was acquired in 1967 and returned to her owners in 1974.

Royal Fleet Auxiliary ship names